Masquerade is a 1929 American drama film directed by Russell Birdwell and written by Malcolm Stuart Boylan and Frederick Hazlitt Brennan. It is based on the 1907 novel The Brass Bowl by Louis Joseph Vance. The film stars Alan Birmingham, Leila Hyams, Arnold Lucy, Clyde Cook, J. Farrell MacDonald and George C. Pearce. The film was released on July 14, 1929, by Fox Film Corporation.

Cast      
Alan Birmingham as Dan Anisty / Dan Maitland
Leila Hyams as Sylvia Graeme
Arnold Lucy as Bannerman
Clyde Cook as Blodgett
J. Farrell MacDonald as Joe Hickey
George C. Pearce as Andrew Graeme 
Rita La Roy as Girl
Frank Richardson as Singer
John Breeden as First Reporter
Jack P. Pierce as Second Reporter
Pat Moriarity as Third Reporter
Jack Carlyle as Fourth Reporter

See also      
The Brass Bowl (1924)

References

External links
 

1929 films
1920s English-language films
1929 drama films
Fox Film films
American black-and-white films
1920s American films